Dombach may refer to:
 Dombach (Emsbach), a river of Hesse, Germany, tributary of the Emsbach
 Dombach (Bad Camberg), one of the constituent communities of Bad Camberg, Germany
 Papiermühle Alte Dombach, a former paper mill in Bergisch Gladbach, Germany, now belonging to the LVR Industrial Museum